Yelena Antonova may refer to:

 Yelena Antonova (rower) (born 1952), Soviet Olympic rower
 Yelena Antonova (cyclist) (born 1971), Kazakhstani cyclist
 Yelena Antonova (synchronised swimmer) (born 1974), Russian Olympic synchronized swimmer
 Elena Antonova (skier) (born 1971), Kazakhstani Olympic cross-country skier
 Olena Antonova (born 1972), Ukrainian discus thrower